Trevor David Ford, OBE (19 April 1925 – 22 February 2017) was an English geologist, specialising in speleology, and an author. He was a Senior Lecturer in the Geology Department of the University of Leicester, and also Associate Dean of Science.

He served in WWII as a Stores Assistant in the Navy.

Ford made a detailed study of Precambrian rocks and fossils, and was instrumental in the recognition of the Precambrian fossil Charnia masoni, discovered in Charnwood Forest by Roger Mason. In doing so, he was honoured by having the species of the genus Hylaecullulus be named after him, with the species being described with the name Hylaecullulus fordi.

He wrote several popular introductions to the geology of England's Peak District, a definitive study of the local fluorite Blue John, as well as numerous cave guides. He served as the editor of Transactions of the British Cave Research Association, renamed Cave Science (later Cave & Karst Science), from 1973 until 1993.

Ford was awarded the Order of the British Empire (OBE) in 1997 for services to geology and cave science. He was a Distinguished Life Vice President of the Leicester Literary and Philosophical Society.

He died on 22 February 2017.

Selected publications 
Books
Ford TD. Rocks and Scenery of the Peak District (Landmark Publishing; 2002)
Ford TD, Rieuwerts JH, eds. Lead Mining in the Peak District (Ashbourne and Landmark Publishing for the Peak District Mines Historical Society; 2000) (4th edn)
Ford TD. Derbyshire Blue John (Landmark Publishing; 2000)
Ford TD, ed. Limestones and Caves of Wales (Cambridge University Press; 1989)
Ford TD, Gill DW. Caves of Derbyshire (Dalesman; 1984)
Ford TD, ed. Limestones and Caves of the Peak District (Geo-Books; 1977) 
Pamphlets
Ford T. Sediments in Caves; BCRA Cave Studies Series 9 (BCRA; 2001)
Gunn J, Ford T. Caves and Karst of the Peak District; BCRA Cave Studies Series 3 (BCRA; 1992)
Research papers
Vidal G, Ford TD (1985). Microbiotas from the late proterozoic chuar group (northern Arizona) and uinta mountain group (Utah) and their chronostratigraphic implications. Precambrian Research 28: 349–89 
Schopf JW, Ford TD, Breed WJ (1973). Microorganisms from the Late Precambrian of the Grand Canyon, Arizona. Science 179: 1319–21
Ford TD (1958). Pre-Cambrian fossils from Charnwood Forest. Proceedings of the Yorkshire Geological Society, 31: 211–217

References

British speleologists
English geologists
Academics of the University of Leicester
1925 births
2017 deaths
Officers of the Order of the British Empire